Lloyd Seyoung Lee (born August 10, 1976) is a former American football coach and safety. He played college football at Dartmouth and professionally for one season with the San Diego Chargers. He was later an assistant coach for the Chicago Bears for five seasons, including an appearance in Super Bowl XLI.

College career
After graduating from Bloomington Jefferson High School in Minnesota, Lee played safety from 1994 to 1998 at Dartmouth College.

Professional career
Lee played safety for the San Diego Chargers in 1998.

Coaching career
Lee was a pro scout for the Tampa Bay Buccaneers before being hired by the Chicago Bears on January 23, 2004 as the defensive quality control coach.  He has held a number of positions with the Bears most recently as linebackers coach. Lee was the nickelbacks coach for the Bears in 2006 and 2007, before being promoted to linebackers coach on January 16, 2008. He was dismissed from this position in January 2009.

In 2017, Lee was outside linebackers coach for Holy Cross.

Business career
From 2010 to 2016, Lee was part of the McDonald's corporate leadership program. In 2016, Lee was vice president of football operations at USA Football. He has been a financial advisor with Edward Jones Investments based in Fishers, Indiana since 2018.

Personal life
Lee is married with two children.

References

External links

1976 births
Living people
People from Bloomington, Minnesota
American sportspeople of Korean descent
American football safeties
Dartmouth Big Green football players
San Diego Chargers players
Chicago Bears coaches
Holy Cross Crusaders football coaches
Sports coaches from Minneapolis
Players of American football from Minneapolis